Pisgah is an unincorporated community in Cooper County, Missouri, United States. The community is located about two miles west of Pisgah Creek (a tributary of Moniteau Creek) on Missouri Route O and eleven miles north-northwest of California. Bunceton is about eight miles to the west on Missouri Route J.

History
Pisgah was platted in 1830, taking its name from a local Baptist church of the same name. The name ultimately is derived from Mount Pisgah, a place mentioned in the Hebrew Bible. A post office called Pisgah was established in 1848, and remained in operation until 1910.

References

Unincorporated communities in Cooper County, Missouri
1830 establishments in Missouri
Unincorporated communities in Missouri